Untamed Youth is a 1957 American teen film directed by Howard W. Koch, written by John C. Higgins and Stephen Longstreet, and starring Mamie Van Doren and Lori Nelson as two starstruck sisters who are sentenced to farm labor.

Plot
Sisters Penny and Jane Lowe are arrested for hitchhiking and skinny-dipping and are sentenced to work on a rural Texas farm for a corrupt agricultural magnate named Russ Tropp. The judge, who sentenced the sisters to the farm, is dating Tropp and is unaware of the treatment of the prisoners; her son is hired to work at the farm and uncovers that a scam had been going on. Through dating the judge, Tropp ensures that all delinquents and rule breakers are ordered to work off their sentence at his farm, therefore giving him a stable amount of cheap labor and allowing him to undercut all competition he faces. The judge's son falls in love with Jane, while Penny, who performs four songs in the film, dreams of making it big in show business. One of the girls, named Baby, at one point falls ill, leaving the judge's son to hijack one of Tropp's cars to rush her to a hospital for treatment. Baby dies from internal hemorrhaging caused by a miscarriage.

Cast

 Mamie Van Doren as Penny Lowe
 Lori Nelson as Jane Lowe
 John Russell as Russ Tropp
 Don Burnett as Bob Steele
 Glenn Dixon as Jack Landis
 Lurene Tuttle as Judge Cecilia Steele Tropp
 Eddie Cochran as Bong
 Yvonne Fedderson as Baby
 Jeanne Carmen as Lillibet
 Robert Foulk as Sheriff Mitch Bowers
 Wayne Taylor as Duke
 Jered Barclay as Ralph
 Valerie Reynolds as Arkie
 Lucita as Margaritia
 Matt Malinowski as Hair

Reception
According to a reviewer for the New York Times who saw the movie's premiere in 1957, Untamed Youth sought to "portray sisters who run afoul of the law and are sent to a prison farm populated almost entirely by rock 'n' roll addicts...Call it a fate almost worse than death." Decades later, the film was featured on an early episode of Mystery Science Theater 3000, and an updated livestream version in 2021 during Joel Hodgson’s Make More MST3K campaign on Kickstarter featuring 4 generations of Tom Servo performers.

Mystery Science Theater 3000 
 
 Episode guide: 112- Untamed Youth

References

External links
 
 
 
 

1957 films
1950s musical drama films
American black-and-white films
American musical drama films
1950s exploitation films
Films directed by Howard W. Koch
Films set in Texas
Films shot in California
1950s prison films
Films scored by Les Baxter
1957 drama films
1950s English-language films
1950s American films